Celebrities Exposed is a British television celebrity talking head documentary series that aired on ITV2 between 2003 and 2005. Repeats still occasionally air on ITV2 despite no new episodes having been made since 2005.

Episodes
"Love on the Rocks"
"Lies, Lies, Lies"
"Cradle Snatchers"
"Celebrity Entourage: Inside The Locker Room"
"Celebrity Entourage: The Powder Room "
"Posh and Becks: For Better, For Worse?"
"Footy, Bling and Babes"
"Dolce and Kabbalah"
"50 Ways to Leave Your Lover"
"Love Machine"
"Viva La Diva"
"The Kids"
"Coming Out"

Celebrity contributors
Uri Geller
Nina Nannar
Linda Papadopoulos
Ben Todd
Nick Farrari
Polly Hudson
Vanessa Lloyd Platt
Angela Buttolph
Richard Mackney
Jo Bunting
Louise Glover
Lisa Jaynes
Terry Christian
Tony Wilson
Karen Krizanovitch
Shaun Keaveny

References

2000s British documentary television series
2003 British television series debuts
2005 British television series endings
ITV (TV network) original programming